Sevata Assembly constituency is one of the 403 constituencies of the Uttar Pradesh Legislative Assembly, India. It is a part of the Sitapur district and one of the five assembly constituencies in the Sitapur Lok Sabha constituency. First election in this assembly constituency was held in 2012 after the  "Delimitation of Parliamentary and Assembly Constituencies Order,  2008" was passed and the constituency was formed in 2008. The constituency is assigned identification number 150.

Wards  / Areas
Extent of Sevata Assembly constituency is KCs Shahpur, Sevata, Rewsa, PCs Jahangirabad & Basudaha of Jahangirabad KC of Biswan Tehsil; KC Rampur Mathura, PCs Chhatauni, Dhamauda & Jaravan of Sadarpur KC of Mahmoodabad Tehsil.

Members of the Legislative Assembly

2017 MLA elections Gyan Tiwari won election for Sevata seat

16th Vidhan Sabha: 2012 General Elections

See also

Sitapur district
Sitapur Lok Sabha constituency
Sixteenth Legislative Assembly of Uttar Pradesh
Uttar Pradesh Legislative Assembly
Vidhan Bhawan

References

External links
 

Assembly constituencies of Uttar Pradesh
Politics of Sitapur district